Tikar may refer to the following places in India
 Tikar, Gujarat
 Tikar, Rajasthan

Tikar may also refer to an ethnic group in Cameroon.